Belait District Museum is a cultural and history museum located at Jalan Maulana, Kuala Belait, Belait District of Brunei.

History
The building itself was built in 1938 and took up 6  of land. It was used as the official residence for the Deputy British Resident and later became the official residence of the Belait District Officers until 1990. In the 1970s, it was expanded to host larger number of people. The building was renovated in 2011 and open as a museum on 23 July 2016. The open day was organized by the Museums Department under the Ministry of Culture, Youth and Sports.

Exhibits
There are five galleries. Four for permanent exhibitions and one reserved for temporary exhibitions. It includes:
 Cultural Heritage (Galeri Warisan Budaya)
 History of the Administration and Development of the Belait District (Galeri Sejarah)
 History of the Oil and Gas Industry
 Natural Heritage (Galeri Warisan Alam Semula Jadi)
 temporary exhibitions

See also
 List of museums in Brunei

References

Museums in Brunei
Historic sites in Brunei